Charles Wheaton Abbot Jr. (1860–1923) (sometimes misspelled as "Abbott") was an American military officer of the late 19th and early 20th centuries. He was commander of the 1st Rhode Island Volunteer Regiment during the Spanish–American War and served as Adjutant General of Rhode Island from 1911 until his death in 1923. He was also a veteran of the Indian Wars, Philippine Insurrection and the First World War.

Early life
Abbot was born in Warren, Rhode Island on July 8, 1860.  He was the son of Rear Admiral Charles Wheaton Abbot Sr., who had served as a pay director in the U.S. Navy during the American Civil War and Annie Frances Smith Abbot. He was also the grandson of Commodore Joel Abbot, a veteran of the War of 1812 who accompanied Commodore Matthew C. Perry on the expedition to open Japan in 1853.  He was a descendant of Brigadier General Nathan Miller who was an officer in the Rhode Island Militia during the American Revolution.

Military career
In 1881 Abbot received a commission in the 12th Infantry as a 2nd lieutenant.  Early in his career his postings were mostly in New York and in the Dakotas. He graduated the Infantry and Cavalry School at Fort Leavenworth, Kansas in 1883. On June 5, 1884, he married Marcia Ransom in Norwich, Connecticut. From 1889 to 1893 he served as the regimental adjutant for the 12th Infantry at Fort Yates in the Dakota Territory.

He was commissioned as colonel of the 1st Rhode Island Volunteer Infantry in May 1898.  On June 9, 1898, the board of managers of the Rhode Island Society of the Sons of the American Revolution voted to present Colonel Abbot with a sword and belt.  The regiment, nicknamed the "Rough Walkers", was posted in South Carolina and Virginia and was mustered out of service on March 30, 1899, without seeing overseas service.

After his discharge from the Volunteers, Abbot returned to the 12th Infantry. From April to December 1899 he was stationed with his regiment at Luneta Barracks in Manila in the Philippine Islands.

In August 1903 he was promoted to major and reassigned to the 25th Infantry Regiment at Washington Barracks in the District of Columbia. He remained there until his retirement from the Regular Army for disability in October 1904.

After Abbot's retirement from the Army, he returned to Rhode Island and became the military advisor to the Rhode Island Militia.  His primary responsibilities were to inspect units of the Rhode Island Militia and to make recommendations to increase their efficiency.

Adjutant General of Rhode Island
In January 1911, Abbot was appointed the Adjutant General of Rhode Island, and was concurrently promoted to the rank of brigadier general.  He held that position until his death in 1923.

As adjutant general, he oversaw the mobilization of Rhode Island National Guard units during the First World War and the implementation of the Selective Service Act. From September 1917 until the end of the war, he served as the professor of military science at Brown University.  He also oversaw the establishment of the Rhode Island State Guard – a state military force which assumed the functions of the National Guard while the National Guard was in Federal service.

Honors
General Abbot served as Chief Scout of the Rhode Island Boy Scouts from March 12, 1911, to March 10, 1912. He was awarded a Master of Arts degree from Brown University in 1922.

Death and burial
General Abbot died at his home in Warren, Rhode Island on November 29, 1923. He is buried in the Abbot family tomb in the South Burial Ground in Warren.

Memberships
Abbot belonged to several military and hereditary societies. He served for one year as the commander of the Rhode Island Department of the Sons of Veterans in 1897.  On October 18, 1891, he was admitted to the Rhode Island Society of the Sons of the American Revolution and served as it president from 1915 to 1916.

He was also a member of the Military Order of the Loyal Legion of the United States, Regular Army and Navy Union, General Society of the War of 1812, Society of Colonial Wars, United Spanish War Veterans and the American Legion.  Photos of General Abbot taken while he was Adjutant General of Rhode Island show him wearing the insignias of several of these organizations in addition to his military medals.

In addition to the above organizations, he was also eligible to join the Sons of the Revolution, Naval Order of the United States, Order of the Indian Wars of the United States, Military Order of Foreign Wars, Naval and Military Order of the Spanish War, Military Order of the Carabao and the Veterans of Foreign Wars.

Military awards
 Indian Campaign Medal
 Spanish War Service Medal
 Philippine Campaign Medal
 Victory Medal
 Rhode Island Militia Service Medal
 Rhode Island Spanish War Service Medal
 Rhode Island "Rough Walker" Medal (unofficial)

Dates of rank

Source – United States Army Register, 1923. pg. 1063.

References

 Online biographical sketch of Charles Wheaton Abbot Jr. – http://www.oocities.org/suvcwricamp21/cwabbot.htm
 National Cyclopedia of American Biography, Vol. XX, pg. 211.

1860 births
1923 deaths
American military personnel of the Philippine–American War
American military personnel of the Spanish–American War
United States Army personnel of World War I
People from Warren, Rhode Island
Brown University alumni
Brown University faculty
United States Army officers
American militia generals
Burials in Rhode Island